Al-Ramadin is a Palestinian village located 24 kilometers southwest of Hebron and includes the smaller village of 'Arab al-Fureijat to the southeast. The village is part the Hebron Governorate in the southern West Bank. According to the Palestinian Central Bureau of Statistics, the two villages had a combined population of 3,853 in 2007. The principal families are al-Sho'ur, al-Zagharna, al-Fureijat, al-Daraghmeh, al-Raghmat, al-Mlihat and al-Masamra. 

Al-Ramadin and 'Arab al-Fureijat were established by Bedouins who fled their traditional homeland in the vicinity of Beersheba in the Negev for the suburbs of ad-Dhahiriya. The name "al-Ramadin" derives from "Ramadan," the patriarch of the main Bedouin tribe that founded the modern village after the 1948 Arab-Israeli War. A nine-member village council was appointed by the Palestinian Authority to administer al-Ramadin and Arab al-Fureijat in 1997. 

There are three active mosques in al-Ramadin, as well as three historic Christian edifices, including the al-Fadi Monastery and al-Asela Church. The primary health care facilities for the village are designated by the Ministry of Health as level 2.

References

External links
Barrier route July 2008
 Ar Ramadin village (fact sheet),  Applied Research Institute–Jerusalem, ARIJ
Ar Ramadin Village Profile, ARIJ
  Ar Ramadin village aerial photo, ARIJ
The priorities and needs for development in Ar Ramadin village based on the community and local authorities’ assessment, ARIJ

Villages in the West Bank
Municipalities of the State of Palestine